Benigno De Grandi (15 June 1924 – 11 December 2014) was an Italian professional football player and manager. He played for Mantova, Seregno, Milan, Palermo and Sampdoria.

References

1924 births
2014 deaths
Italian footballers
Italian football managers
Association football midfielders
U.S. Fiorenzuola 1922 S.S. players
Mantova 1911 players
U.S. 1913 Seregno Calcio players
A.C. Milan players
Palermo F.C. players
U.C. Sampdoria players
Serie B players
Serie A players
Footballers from Emilia-Romagna